John Arthur Heilemann (born January 23, 1966) is an American journalist and national affairs analyst for NBC News and MSNBC. With Mark Halperin, he co-authored Game Change (2010) and Double Down (2013), books about presidential campaigning. Heilemann has formerly been a staff writer for New York, Wired, and The Economist.

Early life and education
Heilemann was born in Los Angeles in 1966 and grew up in Canoga Park. His family was originally from Wisconsin. Heilemann earned a Bachelor of Arts degree in journalism and political science from Northwestern University and a Master of Public Policy degree from the Harvard Kennedy School.

Career 
He is the author of Pride Before the Fall (2001), a book about the Microsoft antitrust case. He has been a staff writer for New York, Wired, and The Economist. He was the host of a four-part documentary series for Discovery called Download: the True Story of the Internet, about the rise of the World Wide Web, which first aired in 2008.

He is the co-author (with Mark Halperin) of Game Change (2010) and Double Down (2013), books about Presidential campaigns. He and Halperin co-hosted With All Due Respect (2014–2017), a political analysis show on Bloomberg Television and MSNBC. Heilemann also produced and co-starred (with Halperin and Mark McKinnon) in Showtime's The Circus: Inside the Greatest Political Show on Earth, following the presidential candidates behind the scenes of their campaigns in the 2016 United States Presidential Election. Heilemann produces and co-stars in episodes of The Circus: Inside the Greatest Political Show on Earth, with Alex Wagner and Mark McKinnon, airing from 2016-22. Heilemann is also an occasional guest on The Tony Kornheiser Show and MSNBC’s Deadline: White House and Morning Joe.

In 2019, Heilemann and John Battelle founded the Recount.  The Recount has a website with video, podcasts, and a newsletter.

Personal life 
Heilemann is married to Diana Rhoten and lives in Manhattan.

Bibliography

See also 

 Morning Joe

References

External links

Article archive at New York magazine

1966 births
Living people
20th-century American journalists
21st-century American non-fiction writers
American male journalists
American political writers
Harvard Kennedy School alumni
Medill School of Journalism alumni
New York (magazine) people
The Economist people
The New Yorker staff writers
Wired (magazine) people
MSNBC people
21st-century American male writers